Formins (formin homology proteins) are a group of proteins that are involved in the polymerization of actin and associate with the fast-growing end (barbed end) of actin filaments.  Most formins are Rho-GTPase effector proteins. Formins regulate the actin and microtubule cytoskeleton 
 and are involved in various cellular functions such as cell polarity, cytokinesis, cell migration and  SRF transcriptional activity. Formins are multidomain proteins that interact with diverse signalling molecules and cytoskeletal proteins, although some formins have been assigned functions within the nucleus.

Diversity 

Formins have been found in all eukaryotes studied.  In humans, 15 different formin proteins are present that have been classified in 7 subgroups. By contrast, yeasts contain only 2-3 formins.

Structure and interactions 
Formins are characterized by the presence of three formin homology (FH) domains (FH1, FH2 and FH3), although members of the formin family do not necessarily contain all three domains. In addition, other domains are usually present, such as PDZ, DAD, WH2, or FHA domains.

The proline-rich FH1 domain mediates interactions with a variety of proteins, including the actin-binding protein profilin, SH3 (Src homology 3) domain proteins, and WW domain proteins. The actin nucleation-promoting activity of S. cerevisiae formins has been localized to the FH2 domain. The FH2 domain is required for the self-association of formin proteins through the ability of FH2 domains to directly bind each other, and may also act to inhibit actin polymerization.  The FH3 domain is less well conserved and is required for directing formins to the correct intracellular location, such the mitotic spindle, or the projection tip during conjugation. In addition, some formins can contain a GTPase-binding domain (GBD) required for binding to Rho small GTPases, and a C-terminal conserved Dia-autoregulatory domain (DAD). The GBD is a bifunctional autoinhibitory domain that interacts with and is regulated by activated Rho family members. Mammalian Drf3 contains a CRIB-like motif within its GBD for binding to Cdc42, which is required for Cdc42 to activate and guide Drf3 towards the cell cortex where it remodels the actin skeleton.  The DAD binds the N-terminal GBD; this link is broken when GTP-bound Rho binds to the GBD and activates the protein. The addition of the DAD to mammalian cells induces actin filament formation, stabilizes microtubules, and activates SRF mediated transcription. Another commonly found domain is an armadillo repeat region (ARR) located in the FH3 domain.

The FH2 domain, has been shown by X-ray crystallography to have an elongated, crescent shape containing three helical subdomains.

Formins also directly bind to microtubules via their FH2 domain. This interaction is important in promoting the capture and stabilization of a subset of microtubules oriented towards the leading edge of migrating cells. Formins also promote the capture of microtubules by the kinetochore during mitosis and for aligning microtubules along actin filaments.

See also 
Formin-2

References

External links 
 MBInfo - Formin mediated actin nucleation

Protein domains
Cell biology
Proteins
Cellular processes